Radio Masr is the first governmental radio station in Egypt to be transmitted on FM. It has launched on April 24, 2009.

See also 
ERTU
 List of radio stations in Egypt

References

External links 
 Radio Masr Official website
 Masri Online

Radio stations in Egypt
2009 establishments in Egypt